The 1973–74 season was Real Madrid Club de Fútbol's 71st season in existence and the club's 42nd consecutive season in the top flight of Spanish football.

Summary
During the summer, the Spanish Football Federation lifted the ban on the transfers of foreign players after eleven seasons. As such, Madrid signed Argentine forward Oscar Más, German midfielder Günter Netzer, as well as bringing in Spanish teenage defender José Antonio Camacho and youngster Vicente del Bosque. On 8 September 1973, the club announced plans to build a new stadium in Fuencarral, a project that was ultimately rejected by City Government. Madrid finished in just eighth place in the league table, sixteen points behind champions CF Barcelona and their new arrival, Dutch playmaker Johan Cruijff, known internationally as Johan Cruyff. Cruyff was instrumental in the 5–0 defeat of Los Blancos at the Bernabéu in the league Clásico. During the campaign, Miguel Muñoz (head coach since 1960) was fired on 14 January 1974 after a bad streak of results, being replaced by Luis Molowny.

Meanwhile, in June the team won the 1974 Copa del Generalísimo Final 4–0 against champions Barcelona.

Shockingly, in the UEFA Cup the squad bowed out early at the hands of Ipswich Town after losing the first leg of the series 0–1 and a achieving only a miserable draw 1–1 in Madrid.

Squad

Transfers

Competitions

La Liga

Position by round

League table

Matches

Copa del Generalísimo

Final

UEFA Cup

First round

Statistics

Players statistics

References

External links
 BDFútbol

Real Madrid CF seasons
Real Madrid